William "Bill", "Bud" George Clark (July 10, 1910 – January 2, 1975) was a Canadian alpine, cross-country, and Nordic combined skier who competed in the 1932 Winter Olympics and in the 1936 Winter Olympics. 

Clark excelled in all styles of skiing, winning national championships in Nordic, alpine, and cross-country classifications. He was born in Ottawa, Ontario.

Olympics

Clark finished 38th in the shorter cross-country skiing competition at the 1932 Olympics.

In 1936, he finished 47th in the 18 kilometre cross-country skiing event and 39th in the Nordic combined skiing competition. He also participated in the alpine skiing combined event but was unplaced due to not finishing the second slalom heat.

He continued to promote the sport later in life, serving as President of the Canadian Ski Association.

Honours
He is a member of the Canadian Ski Hall of Fame.

He was inducted into the Lisgar Collegiate Institute Athletic Wall of Fame (LAWOF) in 2009.  He was uncle to Anne Heggtveit and brother-in-law of Halvor Heggtveit, both of whom are also LAWOF inductees for skiing.

External links
 profile

References

1910 births
1975 deaths
Canadian male alpine skiers
Canadian male cross-country skiers
Canadian male Nordic combined skiers
Olympic alpine skiers of Canada
Olympic cross-country skiers of Canada
Olympic Nordic combined skiers of Canada
Alpine skiers at the 1936 Winter Olympics
Cross-country skiers at the 1932 Winter Olympics
Cross-country skiers at the 1936 Winter Olympics
Nordic combined skiers at the 1936 Winter Olympics
Skiers from Ottawa
Lisgar Collegiate Institute alumni